Achyk-Suu is a village in Chong-Alay District of Osh Region of Kyrgyzstan. Its population was 2,686 in 2021.

References

External links
Achiksu Map – Maplandia.com

Populated places in Osh Region